Angle is an unincorporated community in Piute County, Utah, United States.

Climate
Angle has a semi-arid climate (Köppen BSk) with cold winters, cool-to-hot summers, and very large diurnal temperature variation year-round.

References

Unincorporated communities in Piute County, Utah
Unincorporated communities in Utah